Richie Kotzen is the self-titled first studio album by the American guitarist Richie Kotzen, released on August 11, 1989 through Shrapnel Records.

Track listing

Personnel
Musicians
Richie Kotzen – guitar, keyboards
Stuart Hamm – bass
Steve Smith – drums

Production
Jason Becker, Mike Varney – producers
Tori Swenson – engineer, mixing
Joe Marquez, Marc Reyburn - assistant engineers
Mark Rennick – mixing assistant
George Horn – mastering at Fantasy Studios, Berkeley, California

References

External links
Richie Kotzen at richiekotzen.com
In Review: Richie Kotzen "Richie Kotzen" at Guitar Nine Records

Richie Kotzen albums
1989 debut albums
Shrapnel Records albums
Albums produced by Mike Varney